The 1996–97 NLA season was the 59th regular season of the Nationalliga A.

Regular season

Final standings

Master Round

Qualification round

Playoffs

Quarterfinals

Semifinals

Finals

References
sehv.ch
hockeystats.ch
hockeyarchives.info

External links
hockeyfans.ch
eishockeyforum.ch
spoor.ch

1996–97 in Swiss ice hockey
Swiss